Beethoven is a 1994  American Saturday morning cartoon television series loosely based on the 1992 motion picture of the same name.  The series was produced by Northern Lights Entertainment and Universal Cartoon Studios, and aired for one season on Kideo TV, with 13 episodes with two 10 minute segments produced. Dean Jones, who played Dr. Varnick in the film, voiced the role of George Newton; Nicholle Tom, who played teenage daughter Ryce in the film and Beethoven's 2nd, was the only cast member from the films to reprise her role in the series.

Premise
The Newton family love Beethoven, their St. Bernard dog. But the father, George, has his moments with Beethoven, who gets in different mishaps time after time. When not with the Newton family, Beethoven spends time with three other dogs, Sparky (the stray from the first film), Ginger, and Caesar.

Unlike the film, Beethoven has a speaking voice, at least among the other animals. The same plot was used in another animated series, Free Willy, where the main character also could talk.

Cast

Dean Jones as George Newton
J.D. Daniels as Ted Newton
Bill Fagerbakke as Caesar the Great Dane
Brian George as Mr. Huggs
Tress MacNeille as Ginger the Collie
Joel Murray as Beethoven
Joe Pantoliano as Sparky the Jack Russel Terrier
Francesca Marie Smith as Emily Newton
Kath Soucie as Alice Newton
Nicholle Tom as Ryce Newton
Maurice LaMarche as Doberman

Additional voices

 René Auberjonois
 Hank Azaria as Killer the Poodle
 Gregg Berger as Mailman
 Mark Campbell
 Dan Castellaneta as Blind Shep (in "Scent of a Mutt")
 Christine Cavanaugh as Rosebud (in "Cyrano de Beethoven")
 Brian Cummings
 E.G. Daily as Peanut (in "Puppy Time")
 Stephen DeStefano
 Paul Dooley
 David Doyle as Blind Shep (episode "The Mighty Cone-Dog")
 Jess Harnell as Singing Donut (in "The Big One")
 Bill Henderson
 Dana Hill as Timmy (in "The Kindergarten Caper")
 Tony Jay as Watson (in "Scent of a Mutt")
 Scott Menville
 Art Metrano
 Tim Neil
 John Schuck
 Pamela Segall 
 Justin Shenkarow as Roger (in "Mr. Huggs Wild Ride")

Crew
 Paul Germain - Producer, Story Editor and Voice Director

Episodes

Home release
Universal and Goodtimes released episodes of the show on VHS. In July 2020, the series became available on the Peacock streaming service.

References

External links

1994 American television series debuts
1994 American television series endings
1990s American animated television series
American children's animated adventure television series
American children's animated comedy television series
American children's animated fantasy television series
Animated television series about dogs
CBS original programming
English-language television shows
Animated television shows based on films
Television series by Universal Animation Studios
Beethoven (franchise)